Stary Aldar (İśke Aldar) is a rural locality (a village) in Mesyagutovsky Selsoviet, Yanaulsky District, Bashkortostan, Russia. The population was 82 as of 2010. There is 1 street.

Geography 
Stary Aldar is located 44 km southeast of Yanaul (the district's administrative centre) by road. Mesyagutovo is the nearest rural locality.

References 

Rural localities in Yanaulsky District